Michel Bilamo is a Cameroonian footballer. He competed in the men's tournament at the 1984 Summer Olympics.

References

External links
 
 

Year of birth missing (living people)
Living people
Cameroonian footballers
Cameroon international footballers
Olympic footballers of Cameroon
Footballers at the 1984 Summer Olympics
Place of birth missing (living people)
Association football defenders
Tonnerre Yaoundé players